The 1960 United States presidential election in Arkansas took place on November 8, 1960, as part of the 1960 United States presidential election. State voters chose eight representatives, or electors, to the Electoral College, who voted for president and vice president.

Arkansas was won by Senator John F. Kennedy (D–Massachusetts), running with Senator Lyndon B. Johnson, with 50.19% of the popular vote against incumbent Vice President Richard Nixon (R–California), running with United States Ambassador to the United Nations Henry Cabot Lodge, Jr., with 43.06% of the popular vote. National States' Rights Party candidate Orval Faubus performed best in his home state of Arkansas, earning 6.76% of the vote. Nixon was however the first-ever Republican victor in the five northeastern counties of Clay, Craighead, Fulton, Randolph and Sharp due to powerful "Bible Belt" anti-Catholicism. In 1928 this was muted by the presence of Arkansas Senator Joseph T. Robinson as Al Smith's running mate, and perhaps by perception of Hoover’s ineffectiveness at relieving the great 1927 flood. Nixon was also the first Republican victor in Marion County since Ulysses S. Grant in 1868.

, this is the last time Democratic candidates simultaneously won the presidential election and the state's Class 2 senate seat.

Results

Results by county

See also
 United States presidential elections in Arkansas

References

Arkansas
1960
1960 Arkansas elections